Solar  is a studio album by jazz guitarists John Abercrombie and John Scofield. It was initially released in 1984 by Palo Alto Records and reissued in 2001 by West Wind Records.

Reception
Ken Dryden of Allmusic stated "Guitarists John Abercrombie and John Scofield join forces for these early-'80s sessions, mostly duets while occasionally adding bassist George Mraz and drummer Peter Donald. They delve into the jazz canon with an intricate duet of 'Solar', a driving, Latin-fused take of 'Four on Six' (in which Abercrombie overdubs an electric mandolin), and a dreamy duo interpretation of 'If You Could See Me Now.' The sole standard, 'I Should Care', fares just as well in their hands, which settles into a relaxed exchange between the two players as if they are playing for themselves alone. Scofield's 'Small Wonder' is scored for the quartet, a bristling post-bop vehicle with a feature for Mraz as well. Abercrombie's introspective 'Sing Song' best contrasts the styles of the two leaders, with the composer a bit more melodic and Scofield with a more brittle attack. This is an enjoyable CD that has stood the test of time very well."

Track listing

Personnel
John Abercrombie – electric guitar, electric mandolin
John Scofield – electric guitar
George Mraz – acoustic bass 
Peter Donald – drums

Production
Fred Catero – engineer
Mike McDonald –  engineer
Roger Wiersema – assistant engineer
George Horn – mastering
Orrin Keepnews – producer
John Abercrombie - producer
John Scofield - producer

References

External links

John Abercrombie (guitarist) albums
1984 albums
Albums produced by Orrin Keepnews